USS LST-869 was an  in the United States Navy. Like many of her class, she was not named and is properly referred to by her hull designation.

LST-869 was laid down on 27 October 1944 at Jeffersonville, Indiana, by the Jeffersonville Boat & Machinery Co.; launched on 11 December 1944; sponsored by Mrs. Janie G. Ray; and commissioned on 6 January 1945.

Service history
LST-869 apparently did not see combat service during World War II.

Following World War II, LST-869 performed occupation duty in the Far East and saw service in China until mid-April 1946. She returned to the United States and was decommissioned on 31 July 1946 and struck from the Navy list on 28 August that same year.

On 26 December 1947, the ship was sold to Pablo N. Ferrari & Co. for operation, and was transferred to Argentina.

In Argentine service, LST-869 was renamed Doña Michaela.  She was retired in 1963.

References 

 
 

 

LST-542-class tank landing ships
World War II amphibious warfare vessels of the United States
Ships built in Jeffersonville, Indiana
1944 ships